The Caves of Monte Castillo, located in the Cantabrian town of Puente Viesgo, contain one of the most important Paleolithic sites in the region.
It includes four out of the eighteen caves  listed as World Heritage of UNESCO since July 2008 under the title of Cave of Altamira and Paleolithic Cave Art of Northern Spain: El Castillo, Las Chimeneas, and La Pasiega and Las Monedas. In addition, the complex includes a minor fifth cave, La Flecha. The caves are located along the Pas river in the Castillo mountain, squarely at the intersection of three valleys and near the coast.

The El Castillo cave contains decorations in red ochre in the forms of hand stencils  dated to about 35,000. One red disk in El Castillo has been dated to before 40,000 years ago in a 2012 study, making it the oldest known dated cave decoration.
The  Cave of El Castillo  was discovered in 1903 by Hermilio Alcalde del Río. It  was first explored and excavated by   Hugo Obermaier.

The Cueva de Las Monedas was discovered in 1952. It was explored by Eduardo Ripoll Perelló (1923–2006).
The cave is named for  a number of 16th-century coins found inside. The paintings in this cave date to the Magdalenian, about 13,000 years ago, depicting  horses, goats, bears, bison and reindeer.

See also
Art of the Upper Paleolithic
List of Stone Age art

References

External links

1903 archaeological discoveries
Limestone caves
Monte Castillo
Prehistoric sites in Spain
World Heritage Sites in Spain
Paleolithic Europe
Cave of Altamira and Paleolithic Cave Art of Northern Spain